The 2011 Superstars Series season was the eighth year of the Superstars Series, an Italian-based touring car racing series, featuring the eighth edition of the Campionato Italiano Superstars (Italian Superstars Championship) and the fifth year of the International Superstars Series. The season began at Monza on April 10, and finished at Vallelunga on October 10, after nine rounds. Eight of the nine rounds counted towards the International title, won by Andrea Bertolini driving for Maserati, with six rounds counting towards the Italian title, won by Alberto Cerqui driving for BMW.

Teams and drivers
 All teams used Michelin tyres.

Calendar

Results

Championship standings
Scoring system

Campionato Italiano Superstars

International Superstars Series – Drivers

International Superstars Series – Teams

References

External links
Official Superstars website

Superstars Series
Superstars Series
Superstars Series seasons